A toponymic surname or topographic surname is a surname derived from a place name. This can include specific locations, such as the individual's place of origin, residence, or of lands that they held, or can be more generic, derived from topographic features.

Toponymic surnames originated as non-hereditary personal by-names, and only subsequently came to be family names. The origins of toponymic by-names have been attributed to two non-mutually exclusive trends. One was to link the nobility to their places of origin and their feudal holdings and provide a marker of their status, while the other relates to the growth of the burgher class in the cities, partly via migration from the countryside.  In London in the 13th century, toponymic surnames came to predominate. Also linked to this process was the increased popularity of the names of saints, leading to a reduction in the pool of given names used and the need or personal desire for by-names to distinguish increasing numbers of like-named individuals.

Some forms originally included a preposition, such as at (ten in Dutch, zu in German), by, in, or of (de in French and Spanish, van in Dutch, von in German), subsequently dropped, as in "de Guzmán" (of Guzman) becoming simply Guzmán.  While the disappearance of the preposition has been linked to toponymic by-names becoming inherited family names, it predates this trend.  In England, this can be seen as early as the 11th century, and although there is some regional variation, a significant shift away from preposition usage can be seen to have occurred during the 14th century. In some cases, the preposition has coalesced into the name, such as Atwood (at wood) and Daubney (originating as de Albigni, from Saint-Martin-d'Aubigny). In the aristocratic societies of Europe, both nobiliary and non-nobiliary forms of toponymic surnames exist, and in some languages a degree of differentiation evolved in their treatment. For nobles, the preposition evolved into a nobiliary particle, and in French, for example, a trend evolved in which non-nobiliary forms tended to fuse the preposition whereas nobiliary forms retained it as the discrete particle, although this was never an invariable practice. 

Issues such as local pronunciation can cause toponymic surnames to take a form that varies significantly from the toponym that gave rise to them.  Examples include Wyndham, derived from Wymondham, Anster from Anstruther, and Badgerly from Badgworthy.

One must be cautious to interpret a surname as toponymic based on its spelling alone, without knowing its history. A notable example is the name of Jeanne d'Arc, which is not related to a place called Arc but instead is a distorted patronymic (see "Name of Joan of Arc").  Likewise, it has been suggested that a toponymic cannot be assumed to be a place of residence or origin: merchants could have adopted a toponymic by-name to associate themselves with a place where they never resided.

In Polish, a toponymic surname may be created by adding "(w)ski" or "cki" at the end. For example, Maliszewski is a toponymic surname associated with one of the places in Poland named Maliszew, Maliszewo, or Maliszów.  

In anthroponymic terminology, toponymic surnames belong among topoanthroponyms (class of anthroponyms that are formed from toponyms).

See also
 Nisba (onomastics)
 Territorial designation
 Toponymy

References

Further reading
 David Hey, Family Names and Family History, 2006, 

  
Surname